Roberto Sanseverino or Roberto da Sanseverino may refer to:

Roberto Sanseverino d'Aragona (1418–1487), Italian condottiero
Roberto Sanseverino, Prince of Salerno (c.1430–1474), Neapolitan admiral